
Year 20 BC was either a common year starting on Wednesday or Thursday or a leap year starting on Tuesday, Wednesday or Thursday (link will display the full calendar) of the Julian calendar (the sources differ, see leap year error for further information) and a common year starting on Tuesday of the Proleptic Julian calendar. At the time, it was also known as the Year of the Consulship of Appuleius and Nerva (or, less frequently, year 734 Ab urbe condita). The denomination 20 BC for this year has been used since the early medieval period, when the Anno Domini calendar era became the prevalent method in Europe for naming years.

Events

By place

Roman Empire 
 May 12 – Emperor Augustus Caesar negotiates a peace with Parthia, making Armenia a buffer zone between the two major powers. The captured eagles of Marcus Licinius Crassus and Mark Antony are returned.
 Based on the scenes and the style of the work, the Portland Vase is believed to have been made in Alexandria some time between this year and AD 100.
 King Herod the Great begins renovation of the Temple in Jerusalem.
 Maison Carrée, Nîmes, France, is built (approximate date).

India 
 The Shakas, a nomadic Iranian tribe, no longer control northwest India (approximate date).

By topic

Literature 
 Marcus Verrius Flaccus' De verborum significatu is published. It is one of the first great dictionaries in history.
</onlyinclude>

Births 
 June 3 – Lucius Aelius Sejanus, advisor of Tiberius (d. AD 31)
 Gaius Caesar, grandson of Augustus Caesar (d. AD 4)
 Lucius Antonius, grandson of Mark Antony d. AD 25)
 Philo of Alexandria, Jewish philosopher (d. AD 50)

Deaths 
 Artavasdes I, king of Media Atropatene (approximate date)
 Artaxias II, king of Armenia (Artaxiad Dynasty)
 Fuzhulei Ruodi, ruler of the Xiongnu Empire 
 Mirian II (or Mirvan), king of Iberia (Georgia)
 Mithridates II, king of Commagene (Armenia)

References